Sir Patrick Blake, 1st Baronet  (c. 1742–1784) was a British politician who sat in the House of Commons between 1768 and 1784

Blake was the eldest son of Andrew Blake of St. Kitts and Montserrat and his wife Marcella French of Ireland. He succeeded to the considerable property of his grandfather Patrick Blake of St. Kitts in 1745 but later was left only a shilling by his father. He was educated at Eton College from 1758 to 1760 and was admitted at St. John’s College, Cambridge on 18 August 1760, aged 18. He married Annabella Bunbury, daughter of Rev. Sir William Bunbury, 5th Baronet on 14 April 1762.
 
In 1768, Blake was returned in a contest as Member of Parliament for Sudbury. He was created baronet on 8 October 1772. He was defeated at the 1774 general election but was returned for Sudbury on petition on 22 March 1775. In 1776 his wife Annabelle quit the marriage for France with George Boscawen and the Blakes were divorced in 1778. He topped the poll at Sudbury at the 1780 general election but did not stand in 1784.

Blake died on 1 July 1784.

Through his daughter Annabella Blake, he was the grandfather of Henry John Adeane, Member (MP) of the Parliament of the United Kingdom for Cambridgeshire.

References

1740s births
1784 deaths
People educated at Eton College
Alumni of St John's College, Cambridge
British MPs 1768–1774
British MPs 1774–1780
British MPs 1780–1784
Members of the Parliament of Great Britain for English constituencies
Baronets in the Baronetage of Great Britain